Alexei Vladimirovich Ivanov (born January 5, 1985) is a Russian professional ice hockey player.

Career 
Ivanov was selected by the Chicago Blackhawks in the fifth round (156th overall) of the 2003 NHL Entry Draft. He currently plays with Dizel Penza in the Russian Major League.

References

External links

1985 births
Living people
Chicago Blackhawks draft picks
London Knights players
People from Tynda
Russian ice hockey centres
Salavat Yulaev Ufa players
Toronto St. Michael's Majors players
Sportspeople from Amur Oblast